This Is the Story is the debut studio album from Scottish rock duo The Proclaimers, released in 1987. It was originally released with 12 tracks but after the success of the Gerry Rafferty-produced full band version of "Letter from America", which reached number 3 in the UK Single Chart, it was re-pressed later that year with that track added.

Featuring a stripped-back musical arrangement, the instrumentation on This Is The Story consisted exclusively of hand percussion, acoustic guitar and vocals.

The album was re-issued in 2001. A remastered edition was released in 2011.

Background and recording

Background 
After a 1986 tour with The Housemartins afforded them the opportunity, The Proclaimers performed the songs "Throw the 'R' Away" and "Letter from America" on Channel 4 music program The Tube. Following this performance, the band were signed swiftly to Chrysalis Records and began recording This Is The Story within 5 days of signing.

Recording and production 
After signing to Chrysalis, This is the Story was recorded in London at AIR Studios and Strongroom Studios. The record was produced by John Williams.

Content

Musical style 
The arrangements of This is the Story were described as "sparse but spirited" by AllMusic'''s Timothy Monger, featuring as its sole instrumentation Charlie Reid on six- and twelve-string guitar, and Craig Reid on hand percussion and vocals.

 Themes and lyrics 
Describing This is the Story in 2012, The Scotsman wrote that the record was "written against a backdrop of unemployment and uncertainty".

 Reception 
 Critical reception 

In 1989, Bill Wyman of Chicago Reader commented that This is the Story was "engaging and charming [...] even sharp in places", but "uneven".

 Accolades This is the Story was ranked No. 18 on Record Mirror's "End of Year List" for 1987.This is the Story was rated second best Scottish album ever by The Scotsman newspaper in 2003.

 Influence This Is The Story'' had a notable impact on Canadian alternative rock band Barenaked Ladies, with former member Steven Page calling the album as "perfect for us", elaborating that "it was exactly what we were; two guys with acoustic guitars, singing in harmony. It had all the energy of punk rock but just with acoustic guitars and voices" and Ed Robertson praising it as "the best thing" he'd ever heard.

Track listing
All songs written by Charlie Reid and Craig Reid unless otherwise noted.

Personnel
The Proclaimers
 Craig Reid – vocals, tambourine, bongos, marracas
 Charlie Reid – acoustic six-string and twelve-string guitar, acoustic bass, vocals
 Ian Maidman – bass and keyboards (band versions)

Production
 Produced by John Williams
 Track 13 produced by Gerry Rafferty and Hugh Murphy
 Engineered and mixed by Phil Bodger
 Assistant Engineering (Strongroom Studios): Danton Supple
 Assistant Engineering (Air Studios): Matt Howe
 Photography by Nick Knight
 Design by John Pasche

Chart

References 

1987 debut albums
Chrysalis Records albums
The Proclaimers albums